The Top 100 Historical Persons (超大型歴史アカデミー史上初1億3000万人が選ぶニッポン人が好きな偉人ベスト100発表 in Japanese), aired on Nippon Television on May 7, 2006.  The program featured the results of a survey that asked Japanese people to choose their favorite great person from history. The show featured several re-enactments of scenes from the lives of the people on the list.

The survey asked Japanese people to name their most-liked historical figures, not the most influential. The selection was not restricted to Japanese people, and only about two thirds of the names are Japanese, mostly important Japanese historical figures, such as samurai, prime ministers, war leaders, authors, poets. and popular Meiji Restoration figures.

The program was followed up with a women-only Top-100 list (ニッポン人が好きな１００人の美人) which aired September 23, 2006, and History's 100 Most Influential People: Hero Edition  which aired in March 2007.

List 
The final list was as follows:

  Oda Nobunaga (1534–1582) daimyō in the 16th century
  Sakamoto Ryōma (1836–1867) The samurai who overthrew the Tokugawa shogunate in bakumatsu Japan.
  Toyotomi Hideyoshi (1537–1598) politician, samurai who is regarded as Japan's second "great unifier"
  Matsushita Kōnosuke (1894–1989) industrialist, founder of Panasonic
  Tokugawa Ieyasu (1543–1616) The founder and first shōgun of the Tokugawa shogunate
  Noguchi Hideyo (1876–1928) bacteriologist who in 1911 discovered the agent of syphilis as the cause of progressive paralytic disease.
  Mother Teresa (1910–1997) Roman Catholic nun and missionary
  Helen Keller (1880–1968) author and lecturer who was a deaf-blind person to earn a Bachelor of Arts degree
  Hijikata Toshizō (1835–1869) Fukucho of Shinsengumi, a great swordsman and a talented military leader who resisted the Meiji Restoration
  Saigō Takamori (1828–1877) One of the three great nobles who led the Meiji Restoration.                         
  Princess Diana (1961–1997) Member of British royal family, philanthropist and known for her charity work
  Albert Einstein (1879–1955) physicist, known for theory of relativity
  Misora Hibari (1937–1989) singer and actress
  Fukuzawa Yukichi (1835–1901) Japanese author, writer, teacher, translator, entrepreneur and journalist who founded Keio University
   Anne Frank (1929–1945) diarist, known for "Het Achterhuis"
  Florence Nightingale (1820–1910) English social reformer and statistician, and the founder of modern nursing.
  Yoshida Shigeru (1878–1967) Prime Minister of Japan
  Walt Disney (1901–1966) Entrepreneur, animator, voice actor and film producer.
  Ludwig van Beethoven (1770–1827) German composer and pianist
  Minamoto Yoshitsune (1159–1189) Military commander of the Minamoto clan of Japan in the late Heian and early Kamakura periods
  Ayrton Senna (1960–1994) One of the greatest formula drivers of all time
  Leonardo da Vinci (1452–1519) polymath, universal genius
  Tezuka Osamu (1928–1989)  Manga artist who created Astro Boy, cartoonist, animator, film producer, medical doctor
  Napoleon Bonaparte (1769–1821) Emperor of French 
  Prince Shōtoku (574–622) Semi-legendary regent and a politician of the Asuka period in Japan who served under Empress Suiko.
  John Lennon (1940–1980) Member of The Beatles
  Zhuge Liang (181–234) Imperial Chancellor and regent of the state of Shu Han during the Three Kingdoms period
  Miyamoto Musashi (1584–1645) Japanese swordsman, philosopher, writer and rōnin.
  Ozaki Yutaka (1965–1992) Musician
  Audrey Hepburn (1929–1993) British actress during Hollywood's Golden Age, dancer and humanitarian.
  Mahatma Gandhi (1869–1948) activist, that led to Indian independence movement against British rule. 
  Soseki Natsume (1867–1916) novelist
  Takasugi Shinsaku (1839–1867) Samurai from the Chōshū Domain of Japan who contributed significantly to the Meiji Restoration.
  Murasaki Shikibu novelist and poet
  Wolfgang Amadeus Mozart (1756–1791) Austria's greatest composer
  Yamamoto Isoroku (1884–1943) Marshal Admiral of the Navy and the commander-in-chief of the Combined Fleet during World War II
  Miyazawa Kenji (1896–1933) author for children's literature
  John F. Kennedy (1917–1963) 35th President of United States
  Ninomiya Sontoku (1787–1856) Agricultural leader, philosopher, moralist and economist
  Kondō Isami (1834–1868) Japanese swordsman and official of the late Edo period
  Ōkubo Toshimichi (1830–1878) Main founders of Modern Japan.
  Takeda Shingen (1521–1573) pre-eminent daimyō in feudal Japan 
  Himiko (d. 248) was a shaman queen of Yamataikoku in Wa (ancient Japan)
  Inō Tadataka (1745–1818) surveyor and cartographer, completed the first map of Modern Japan.
  Ishihara Yujiro (1934–1987) actor and singer
  Sen no Rikyū (1522–1591) Prominent figure who had influence on chanoyu, the Japanese "Way of Tea", particularly the tradition of wabi-cha
  Charlie Chaplin (1889–1977) actor of Silent Era
  Sugihara Chiune (1900–1986) Government official who served as vice consul for the Japanese Empire in Lithuania
  Date Masamune (1567–1636) Regional ruler of Japan's Azuchi–Momoyama period through early Edo period
  Tanaka Giichi (1864–1929) Prime Minister of Japan
  Bruce Lee (1940–1973) Hong Kong actor and martial artist
  Okita Sōji (1842–1868) The captain of the first unit of the Shinsengumi, a special police force in Kyoto during the late shogunate period
  Matsuda Yusaku (1949–1989) One of Japan's most important actors
  Marie Antoinette (1755–1793) The last Queen of France before the French Revolution
  Ōishi Kuranosuke (1659–1703) (karō) of the Akō Domain in Harima Province
  Ikariya Chosuke (1931–2004) comedian and film actor
  Wright Brothers
  Katsu Kaishū (1823–1899) statesman and naval engineer during the late Tokugawa shogunate and early Meiji period
  Martin Luther King Jr. (1929–1968) civil rights activist for black people
  Yoshida Shōin (1830–1859) distinguished intellectual in the closing days of the Tokugawa shogunate
  Kurosawa Akira (1910–1998) Japan's greatest director
  Uesugi Kenshin (1530–1578) daimyō
  Marie Curie (1867–1934) physicist and chemist, First woman to win a Nobel Prize
  Satō Eisaku (1901–1975) Prime Minister of Japan
  Sanada Yukimura (1567–1615) Samurai warrior of the Sengoku period
  Cao Cao (155–220) Chinese warlord and the penultimate Chancellor of the Eastern Han dynasty 
  Kato Daijiro (1976–2003) Grand Prix motorcycle road racer,
   Cleopatra (69BC–30BC) the last active ruler of the Ptolemaic Kingdom of Egypt
  Tokugawa Mitsukuni (1628–1701) Prominent daimyō who was known for his influence in the politics of the early Edo period
  Elvis Presley (1935–1977) King of Rock and Roll
  Ogi Akira (1935–2005) professional Japanese baseball player, coach and manager
  Tōgō Heihachirō (1848–1934) Gensui or admiral of the fleet in the Imperial Japanese Navy and one of Japan's greatest naval heroes
  Christopher Columbus (1451–1506) Italian explorer, navigator, and colonizer that discovered America
  Itō Hirobumi (1841–1909) statesman and genrō
  Pablo Picasso (1881–1973) 20th century best painter
  Marco Polo (1254–1324) Italian explorer
  Albert Schweitzer (1875–1965)  French-German theologian, organist, writer, humanitarian, philosopher, and physician. 
  Yosano Akiko (1878–1942) author and social activist
  Andy Hug (1964–2000) Swiss karateka and one of the best kickboxers
  Tsuburaya Eiji (1901–1970) special effects director, co-creator of Godzilla
  Joan of Arc (1412–1431) Roman Catholic saint
  Honda Minako (1967–2005) pop star
  Uemura Naomi (1941–1984) adventurer
  Sugita Genpaku (1733–1817) scholar known for his translation of Kaitai Shinsho
  Confucius (551BC–479BC) ancient philosopher
  Jean-Henri Casimir Fabre (1823–1915) French naturalist, entomologist
  Natsume Masako (1957–1985) actress
  Ferdinand Magellan (1480–1521) Portuguese explorer who organised the Spanish expedition to the East Indies from 1519 to 1522
  Honda Soichiro (1906–1991) engineer, founder of Honda
  Anne Sullivan (1866–1937) teacher, lifelong companion of Helen Keller
  Shohei "Giant" Baba (1938–1999) professional wrestler, co-founder of All Japan Pro Wrestling
  Abraham Lincoln (1809–1865) 16th President of United States
  Dazai Osamu (1909–1948) author
  Frédéric Chopin (1810–1849) Polish composer
  Ikkyū (1391–1481) iconoclastic Japanese Zen Buddhist monk and poet.
  Akechi Mitsuhide (1528–1582) samurai and general who lived during the Sengoku period of Feudal Japan
  Isaac Newton (1642–1727) physicist and theologian, known for implementing the law of gravity
  Matsuo Bashō (1644–1694) most known poet during Edo period
  Arthur Conan Doyle (1859–1930) writer, known for creating the character Sherlock Holmes

See also

Greatest Britons spin-offs

References

External links
NTV: 「１００人の偉人　勇気をくれたスター編」 日本人が好きな１００人のスター 

2006 in Japanese television
2006 television specials
Japan
Lists of Japanese people
Nippon TV original programming